The University Hospital Arnau de Vilanova (officially, Hospital Universitari Arnau de Vilanova in Catalan) is a public medical institution in Lleida, Catalonia, Spain, and the largest one in the surrounding area (terres de Lleida or terres de Ponent) and province.

It was opened in 1956. Not to be confused with a hospital in Valencia called Hospital Arnau de Vilanova, the hospital in Lleida is run by the Catalan Health Institute (ICS) and has a total of 447 beds. Nowadays named after the Valencian physician Arnau de Vilanova, its first official name (in Francoist Spain) was Residencia Sanitaria General Moscardó and belonged, at first, to the Instituto Nacional de Previsión (INP) and then to INSALUD until 1981, when it was transferred to the Generalitat de Catalunya.

External links 
Hospital Universitari Arnau de Vilanova official website
ICS official website

Hospital buildings completed in 1956
Teaching hospitals in Spain
Buildings and structures in Lleida
Hospitals in Catalonia
Hospitals established in 1956
1956 establishments in Spain